Augustus Drum (November 26, 1815 – September 15, 1858) was a Democratic member of the U.S. House of Representatives from Pennsylvania.

Biography
Augustus Drum was born in Greensburg, Pennsylvania.  He received private instruction and attended Greensburg Academy.  He graduated from Jefferson College (now Washington and Jefferson College) in Canonsburg, Pennsylvania.  He studied law, was admitted to the bar in 1836 and commenced practice in Greensburg.  He was a member of the Pennsylvania State Senate in 1852 and 1853.  He also held several local offices.

Drum was elected as a Democrat to the Thirty-third Congress.  He was an unsuccessful candidate for reelection in 1854.  He resumed the practice of law in Greensburg and died there in 1858.  Interment in St. Clair Cemetery.

External links

The Political Graveyard

1815 births
1858 deaths
Washington & Jefferson College alumni
Democratic Party Pennsylvania state senators
Pennsylvania lawyers
Democratic Party members of the United States House of Representatives from Pennsylvania
19th-century American politicians
19th-century American lawyers